Maria Giulia Confalonieri (born 30 March 1993) is an Italian track and road racing cyclist, who currently rides for UCI Women's World Tour Team Uno-X Pro Cycling. She previously rode for UCI Women's Continental Team .

As a Junior rider on the track, she won the points race at the 2011 UCI Junior Track World Championships. At under-23 level, Confalonieri won the scratch race at the 2013 UEC European Track Championships. On the road she competed at the 2013 UCI Road World Championships in the women's team time trial.

Major results

Track

2012
 UEC European Under-23 Track Championships
3rd  Points race
3rd  Team pursuit (with Elena Cecchini, Giulia Donato and Chiara Vannucci)
2013
 UEC European Under-23 Track Championships
1st  Scratch
3rd  Points race
3rd  Team pursuit (with Beatrice Bartelloni, Elena Cecchini and Chiara Vannucci)
 1st Points race, 6 giorni delle rose – Fiorenzuola (Under-23)
 2nd Scratch, Copa Internacional de Pista
 2nd Scratch, 3 Jours d'Aigle
 3rd Omnium, UIV Talents Cup Final (Under-23)
2014
 1st Points race, International Track Women & Men (Under-23)
 UEC European Under-23 Track Championships
2nd  Points race
3rd  Team pursuit (with Beatrice Bartelloni, Elena Cecchini and Francesca Pattaro)
2015
 2nd Points race, 3 Jours d'Aigle
2016
 3 Jours d'Aigle
1st Scratch
3rd Points race
 3rd Omnium, Prova Internacional de Anadia
2017
 Track Cycling Challenge
1st Omnium
2nd Madison (with Letizia Paternoster)
 3rd  Madison, 2017–18 UCI Track Cycling World Cup, Pruszków (with Elisa Balsamo)
 3rd  Elimination race, UEC European Track Championships
 9th Overall Six Day London
2018
 2017–18 UCI Track Cycling World Cup, Minsk
1st  Madison (with Letizia Paternoster)
2nd  Points race

Road

2012
 3rd GP Liberazione
2014
 3rd Road race, National Road Championships
 8th Dwars door de Westhoek
 9th Overall Auensteiner-Radsporttage
 10th Drentse 8 van Dwingeloo
2015
 5th Overall Giro della Toscana Int. Femminile – Memorial Michela Fanini
1st Young rider classification
 6th Dwars door de Westhoek
 7th Time trial, UEC European Under-23 Road Championships
 9th Winston-Salem Cycling Classic
 9th Philadelphia Cycling Classic
 10th Overall The Women's Tour
2016
 4th Overall BeNe Ladies Tour
 5th RideLondon Grand Prix
 5th Crescent Vårgårda UCI Women's WorldTour
 5th Madrid Challenge by La Vuelta
 7th Pajot Hills Classic
 9th Gran Premio Bruno Beghelli Internazionale Donne Elite
 10th Overall Ladies Tour of Norway
 10th La Course by Le Tour de France
2017
 2nd Trofee Maarten Wynants
 3rd Gooik–Geraardsbergen–Gooik
 5th Gran Premio Bruno Beghelli Internazionale Donne Elite
 6th Overall Giro della Toscana Int. Femminile – Memorial Michela Fanini
 6th Gent–Wevelgem
 8th Overall Grand Prix Elsy Jacobs
 9th Road race, UEC European Road Championships
 9th Crescent Vårgårda UCI Women's WorldTour
2018
 2nd Overall Giro della Toscana Int. Femminile – Memorial Michela Fanini
1st  Points classification
 2nd Gran Premio della Liberazione
 3rd Omloop Het Nieuwsblad
 4th Omloop van het Hageland
 5th Brabantse Pijl Dames Gooik
 5th Trofee Maarten Wynants
 6th Three Days of Bruges–De Panne
 7th Acht van Westerveld
 7th Gooik–Geraardsbergen–Gooik
 7th Crescent Vårgårda
 10th Road race, Mediterranean Games
2019
 7th Overall Grand Prix Elsy Jacobs
 7th SwissEver GP Cham-Hagendorn
 Postnord UCI WWT Vårgårda West Sweden
7th Road race
7th Team time trial
 9th Prudential RideLondon Classique
 9th Gran Premio Bruno Beghelli Internazionale Donne Elite
2020
 3rd Clasica Femenina Navarra
 7th Brabantse Pijl Dames Gooik
 8th GP de Plouay
2021
 3rd Overall Festival Elsy Jacobs
 5th Diamond Tour
 6th GP Oetingen
 6th Grand Prix International d'Isbergues
 7th Nokere Koerse
2022
 3rd Gent–Wevelgem
 3rd GP Oetingen
 3rd Gran Premio della Liberazione
 8th Omloop Het Nieuwsblad
 8th Drentse Acht van Westerveld
 9th Grand Prix du Morbihan Féminin
2023
 2nd Le Samyn des Dames

References

External links
 
 
 
 

1993 births
Living people
Italian female cyclists
Italian track cyclists
European Championships (multi-sport event) gold medalists
Cyclists of Fiamme Oro
Cyclists from the Province of Monza e Brianza
People from Giussano